Chenghua District is one of 11 urban districts of the prefecture-level city of Chengdu, the capital of Sichuan Province, Southwest China, covering part of the eastern portion of the city.  it had a population of 938,785 residing in an area of . The district is bordered by Xindu District to the northeast, Longquanyi District to the southeast, Jinjiang District to the south, and Jinniu District to the west.

Education
Oxford International College of Chengdu is located in the Bali area of Chenghua District.

The Chengdu University of Technology is also located in Chenghua.

References

External links
 

Districts of Chengdu